Charles K. Gerrard (20 December 1883 – 1 January 1969), also known as Charles Kavanagh, was an Irish-American motion-picture actor, and the elder brother of actor and film director Douglas Gerrard.

Selected filmography

 His Brother's Wife (1916)
 The Prince Chap (1916) - Jack Rodney, Earl of Huntington
 Miss Petticoats (1916) - Count Renier
 The Country That God Forgot (1916) - Craig Wells
 The Plow Girl (1916) - Lord Percy Brentwood
 The Heart of Texas Ryan (1917) - Sen. J. Murray Allison (uncredited)
 Melting Millions (1917) - Hamilton
 A Woman's Awakening (1917) - Lawrence Topham
 Down to Earth (1917) - Charles Riddles - Ethel's Lover
 Little Miss Optimist (1917) - Samuel Winter
 The Fair Barbarian (1917) - Capt. Francis Barold
 The Legion of Death (1918) - Grand Duke Orlof
 The Demon (1918) - Tom Rearrdon
 Playthings (1918) - Gordon Trenwith
 The Hun Within (1918) - Karl Wagner
 Beans (1918) - Wingate
 She Hired a Husband (1918) - Gerald Grant
 Venus in the East (1919) - Maddie Knox
 Pettigrew's Girl (1919) - Hugh Varick
 Something to Do (1919) - Thompson
 The Pest (1919) - John Harland
 The New Moon (1919) - Theo Kameneff
 The Isle of Conquest (1919) - Van Surdam
 The Teeth of the Tiger (1919) - Gordon Savage
 Counterfeit (1919) - Vincent Cortez
 Mary Ellen Comes to Town (1920) - William Gurson, aka 'Will the Weasel'
 Why Women Sin (1920) - Baron de Ville
 Whispers (1920) - J. Dyke Summers
 The World and His Wife (1920) - Don Alvarez
 Blackbirds (1920) - Duval
 The Passionate Pilgrim (1921) - Qualters
 Out of the Chorus (1921) - Ned Ormsby
 The Gilded Lily (1921) - John Stewart
 Sheltered Daughters (1921) - French Pete
 Conceit (1921) - Carl Richards
 French Heels (1922) - Keith Merwyn
 Heroes and Husbands (1922) - Martin Tancray
 Sure Fire Flint (1922) - Dipley Poole
 When Knighthood Was in Flower (1922) - Sir Adam Judson
 The Lights of New York (1922) - Jim Slade
 Pawned (1922) - Dr. Crang
 Anna Ascends (1922) - Count Rostoff
The Darling of the Rich  (1922) - Torrence Welch
 The Glimpses of the Moon (1923) - 'Streffy' (Lord Altringham)
 Richard the Lion-Hearted (1923) - Sultan Saladin
 The Dangerous Maid (1923) - Sir Peter Dare
 Her Temporary Husband (1923) - Clarence Topping
 Loving Lies (1924) - Tom Hayden
 Lilies of the Field (1924) - Ted Conroy
 Circe, the Enchantress (1924) - Ballard 'Bal' Barrett
 Off the Highway (1925) - Hector Kindon
 California Straight Ahead (1925) - Creighton Deane
 The Man on the Box (1925) - Count Karaloff
 The Wedding Song (1925) - Paul Glynn
 Accused (1925) - Lait Rodman
 The Better 'Ole (1926) - Maj. Russett
 The Nervous Wreck (1926) - Reggie De Vere
 For Wives Only (1926) - Dr. Carl Tanzer
 The Cheerful Fraud (1926) - Steve
 Play Safe (1927) - Scott's son
 The Heart Thief (1927) - Count Lazlos
 Framed (1927) - Arthur Remsen
 Painting the Town (1927) - Raymond Tyson
 Home Made (1927) - Robert Van Dorn
 The Port of Missing Girls (1928) - DeLeon
 Ladies of the Night Club (1928)
 The Wright Idea (1928) - Mr. Roberts
 Caught in the Fog (1928) - Crook
 Romance of a Rogue (1928) - Leonard Hardingham
 The Lone Wolf's Daughter (1929) - Count Polinac
 Circumstantial Evidence (1929) - Henry Lord
 Light Fingers (1929) - London Tower
 Men Without Women (1930) - Cmdr. Weymouth
 Journey's End (1930) - Pvt. Mason
 Anybody's Woman (1930) - Walter Harvey
 Another Fine Mess (1930, Short) - Lord Leopold Ambrose Plumtree (uncredited)
 The Lion and the Lamb (1931) - Bert
 The Man Who Came Back (1931) - Gibson (uncredited)
 Dracula (1931) - Martin
 Always Goodbye (1931) - Bit Role (uncredited)
 The Big Gamble (1931)
 The Menace (1932) - Bailiff
 Devil's Lottery (1932) - Toaster (uncredited)
 Man About Town (1932) - Minor Role
 If I Were Free (1933) - Minor Role (uncredited)
 Facing the Music (1933) - (uncredited)
 A Political Party (1934) - Mr. Whitman (final film role)

References

External links

 
 

1883 births
1969 deaths
People from County Carlow
Irish male film actors
Irish male silent film actors
20th-century Irish male actors
Irish emigrants to the United States (before 1923)